Kaleo is a small town in Ghana.

Location
The town is located in Nadowli-Kaleo District, in the Upper West Region of Ghana, close to the border with Burkina Faso. The geographical coordinates of Kaleo, Ghana are:10°10'25.0"N, 2°32'31.0"W (Latitude:10.173611; Longitude:-2.541944).

Electricity
Kaleo is the location of Kaleo Solar Power Station. The power station, which was developed in phases, saw the completion of phase one, with capacity of 13 MW, in 2022. Phase two is expected to come online in 2023 and add another 15 MW to the power station's generation capacity, for a total of 28 MW. The solar farm was developed and is owned by the Volta River Authority.

Transport
The Wa–Lawra Road (Highway N2), connecting the regional capital to the town of Lawra at the border with Burkina Faso, runs through the middle of Kaleo in a general north to south direction.

References

External links
 About Kaleo, Ghana

Populated places in the Upper West Region